Liolopidae is a family of trematodes belonging to the order Diplostomida.

Genera:
 Dracovermis Brooks & Overstreet, 1978
 Harmotrema Nicoll, 1914
 Liolope Cohn, 1902

References

Platyhelminthes